Barnala is one of the districts of Indian state of Punjab. It was carved out of Sangrur district. It is a centrally located district bordered by Ludhiana district on the north, Moga district on northwest, Bathinda district on west and by Sangrur district on all other sides. As per census 2011, Population of District Barnala is 5,96,294. Barnala has sufficient number of Colleges to provide sufficient education in the field of Engineering, Arts, Medical and Commerce. Also Barnala is well known for its Industries. Two main Industries Trident Group which is mainly known for its world class towels is established in this District. Second a large Industry producing combines, Standard Combines is also established here.

It is a centrally located district bordered by Ludhiana district on the north, Moga district on the northwest, Bathinda district on the west and by Sangrur district on all other sides. The current MLA of the district is Mr. Meet Hayer of AAP.

As of 2011 it is the least populous district of Punjab (out of 23).

District administration

The Deputy Commissioner (DC), an officer belonging to the Indian Administrative Service, is the overall in-charge of the general administration in the district. Currently Harish Kumar Nayar, IAS is Deputy Commissioner of Barnala District. He is assisted by a number of officers belonging to Punjab Civil Service and other state services.
The Senior Superintendent of Police (SSP) is entrusted with the responsibility of maintaining law and order and related issues of the district. Currently, Mr.Sandeep Malik, IPS is the Senior Superintendent of Police. He is expected to maintain very cordial relations with all the NGO's and social associations of the city. He is assisted by the officers of the Punjab Police Service and other Punjab Police officials.
Indian Red Cross Society (IRC). Red Cross is globally accredited for its presence in providing quality health care services and always extends a helping hand to the needy. Indian Red Cross Society (IRC), Barnala District branch is having Mr. Sarwan Singh as its secretary. Patrons, Life Members, and volunteers of the society recently attended a "Seminar on Fund Raising and Capacity Building" at Ferozepur (the border town of Punjab)on 26 April 2011. Dr. Raj Kumar Jindal led the delegation.
The District Public Relations Officer (DPRO). He is responsible for public relations of the state government as well as the district administrations. He issues and authorizes press notes to the print and electronic media of the district. Maintains records of all press and electronic channel reporters. Currently, Smt. Megha Mann is the DPRO of the Barnala District.
The Divisional Forest Officer (DFO), an officer belonging to the Indian Forest Service is responsible for managing the forests, environment, and wildlife-related issues of the district. He is assisted by the officers of the Punjab Forest Service and other Punjab Forest officials and Punjab Wild-Life officials. Sectoral development is looked after by the district head of each development department such as PWD, Agriculture, Health, Education, and Animal husbandry. These officers belong to various State Services.
The District Informatics Officer (DIO), head of National Informatics Center. This department works regarding the E-Governance and other Technology-based Services that provide an automated environment to do the various tasks in District Office. Currently, Mr.Mohammad kasif is DIO.

Demographics

According to the 2011 census Barnala district has a population of 595,527, roughly equal to the nation of Solomon Islands or the US state of Wyoming. This gives it a ranking of 527th in India (out of a total of 640). Its population growth rate over the decade 2001-2011 was 13.16%. Barnala has a sex ratio of 876 females for every 1000 males, and a literacy rate of 68.9%. Scheduled Castes made up 32.24% of the population.

At the time of the 2011 census, 95.14% of the population spoke Punjabi and 4.30% Hindi as their first language.

Politics

Notable people
 
 
 Ram Sarup Ankhi - Punjabi writer, novelist and poet
 Surjit Singh Barnala - politician who served as the chief minister of Punjab state
 Karam Singh - soldier who was the first living recipient of the Param Vir Chakra

See also
Chananwal
Pharwahi
Uppli

References

External links 

 

 
Districts of Punjab, India
 
Cities and towns in Barnala district